Haunting Evidence is an American documentary television series following the travels of a psychic profiler, a spirit  medium, and a paranormal investigator. The trio travels the United States investigating "cold case" homicide and missing persons cases. The premise of the series was that this "team of unconventional investigators" could shed new light on unsolved crimes.

The series began production in October 2005 and premiered on Court TV (now truTV) December 21, 2005 with a run of 9 episodes in Season 1. Season 2  premiered on June 20, 2007. There were 4 hour-long special episodes comprising Season 3. The series ended production after a total of 27 episodes, and is currently still broadcast in worldwide syndication as of 2019. The psychic-crime paranormal reality series stars well-known psychic profiler Carla Baron, medium John J. Oliver, and paranormal investigator Patrick Burns.

Episodes

Season 1

Season 2

Season 3

Results 
None of the cases investigated by the show were solved because of the show. Two cases were later closed by police work:

Episode 107, "Mystery in the Desert", Season 1: the perpetrator of the crime, Gabriel Avila, was linked to Katie Sepich via DNA evidence, in December 2006.
Episode 209, "Wiregrass Murders", Season 2: Coley McCraney was charged in April 2019 with the murder of the two girls using DNA and genetic genealogy.

References

External links 

Paranormal television
2000s American crime television series
2005 American television series debuts
2008 American television series endings
TruTV original programming